Kenaker may refer to:
 Kanakerr, Armenia
 Kanakerravan, Armenia